Wolfgang Schwarz (born 14 September 1947, in Vienna) is an Austrian former figure skater. He is the 1968 Olympic gold medalist (one of the youngest male figure skating Olympic champions), a two-time (1967–1968) World silver medalist, and three-time (1967–1969) European silver medalist. Prior to the Grenoble Olympics, he had finished second to Austrian teammate Emmerich Danzer multiple times at the World and European Championships.

In December 2002, Schwarz was convicted on charges of trafficking in human beings after he brought five women from Russia and Lithuania to Austria to work as prostitutes. He was given an 18-month sentence, postponed due to his skin cancer. In December 2005, he was acquitted in a separate case of human trafficking. In August 2006, he was convicted and sentenced to eight years in prison for plotting a kidnapping of a Romanian teenager.

Competitive highlights

References

1947 births
Living people
Austrian male single skaters
Olympic figure skaters of Austria
Figure skaters at the 1968 Winter Olympics
Figure skaters at the 1964 Winter Olympics
Olympic gold medalists for Austria
Austrian criminals
Austrian prisoners and detainees
Figure skaters from Vienna
Olympic medalists in figure skating
World Figure Skating Championships medalists
European Figure Skating Championships medalists
Recipients of the Decoration of Honour for Services to the Republic of Austria

Medalists at the 1968 Winter Olympics